Sir Leslie Patrick Abercrombie  (6 June 1879 – 23 March 1957) was an English regional and town planner. Abercrombie was an academic during most of his career, and prepared one city plan and several regional studies prior to the Second World War. He came to prominence in the 1940s for his urban plans of the cities of Plymouth, Hull, Bath, Bournemouth, Hong Kong, Edinburgh, Clyde Valley and Greater London.

Early life
Patrick Abercrombie was born in Ashton-upon-Mersey, one of the nine children of Sarah and William Abercrombie, a stockbroker and businessman who had wide artistic interests, particularly of the Arts and Crafts school.  In 1887, the family moved to a new home in Sale, designed by a Leicester architect, Joseph Goddard, with interiors influenced by designer John Aldam Heaton.  Abercrombie was educated at Uppingham School, and spent a year at the Realschule in Lucerne, Switzerland.

Career
In 1897, he was articled to the architect Charles Heathcote, while studying at the Manchester School of Art.  After four years, he started work under Arnold Thornely in Liverpool,  and set up home in Birkenhead, which remained his home until 1936.  After a year working in Chester with architect Philip Lockwood, in 1907 he was offered a post as junior lecturer and studio instructor at the University of Liverpool School of Architecture.  In 1914 he won a town planning competition for Dublin, and the following year was appointed as Lever Professor of Civic Design at Liverpool, soon becoming a nationally-known authority on town planning and the garden city movement.

He was later appointed as Professor of Town Planning at University College London, and gradually asserted his dominance as an architect of international renown, which came about through the replanning of Plymouth, Hull, Bath, Edinburgh and Bournemouth, among others. Of his post-war replanning of Plymouth, Sir Simon Jenkins writes:
Poor Plymouth. It was badly blitzed in the Second World War and then subjected to slash and burn by its city fathers. The modern visitor will find it a maze of concrete blocks, ill-sited towers and ruthless road schemes. Most of this damage was done by one man, Patrick Abercrombie, in the 1950s. The old Barbican district would, in France or Germany, have had its façades restored or rebuilt. Here new buildings were inserted with no feeling for the texture of the old lanes and alleys.

In the 1920s and 1930s, Abercrombie developed a specialty in regional planning, became chairman of the Council for the Preservation of Rural England in 1926, and was on the Council of the Town and Country Planning Association.

In 1937, he served as President of the Geographical Association. His Presidential Address was entitled 'Geography - the Basis of Planning'.

Greater London planning
He is best known for the post-Second World War replanning of London. In 1943 he created the County of London Plan, and in 1944 the Greater London Plan, together commonly referred to as the Abercrombie Plan. The latter document was an extended and more thorough product than the 1943 publication. The Greater London Plan proposed that physical growth of London should be stopped by a green belt and that over a million people should move out to expanded towns beyond it.

In 1945 he published A Plan for the City & County of Kingston upon Hull, with the assistance of Sir Edwin Lutyens.  Lutyens had died the year before publication whilst much of the plan was being finalised, and the plan was ultimately rejected by the Councillors of Hull.

New towns movement
From the Abercrombie Plan came the New Towns movement which included the building of Harlow and Crawley and the largest 'out-county' estate, Harold Hill in north-east London.  He produced the Clyde Valley Regional Plan in 1946 with Robert Matthew that proposed the new towns of East Kilbride and Cumbernauld. In 1949 he published with Richard Nickson a plan for the redevelopment of Warwick, which proposed demolition of almost all the town's Victorian housing stock and construction of a large inner ring road.

International projects
During the postwar years, Abercrombie was commissioned by the British government to redesign Hong Kong, for which he submitted plans in 1947.  In 1956 he was commissioned by Haile Selassie to draw up plans for the capital of Ethiopia, Addis Ababa; he submitted the plan in 1957 but its major aspects were not carried out.

Awards
Abercrombie was appointed a Knight Bachelor in the 1945 New Year Honours.  He was the most celebrated British planner of his generation. In 1948 he became the first president of the newly formed group the International Union of Architects, or the UIA (Union Internationale des Architectes).  The group now annually awards the Sir Patrick Abercrombie Prize, for excellence in town planning. In 1950 he received the AIA Gold Medal.

Legacy
The Abercrombie Building at Oxford Brookes University is home to the Faculty of Technology, Design and Environment. He appears in the film The Proud City presenting his plan to the public.

He died in 1957. A blue plaque has been erected at a house where he lived from 1915 to 1935, on Village Road, Oxton, Merseyside.

He was the architect of the North East Wales Institute of Higher Education (NEWI) in Wrexham.

Family
Abercrombie married Emily Maud Gordon in 1908; they had one son and one daughter. He was widowed in 1942. Abercrombie was the brother of the poet and critic, Lascelles Abercrombie and uncle to Michael Abercrombie.

Publications
 Patrick Abercrombie, Sydney Kelly and Arthur Kelly, Dublin of the future : the new town plan, being the scheme awarded first prize in the international competition, University Press of Liverpool, Liverpool, 1922.
 Patrick Abercrombie and John Archibald, East Kent Regional Planning Scheme Survey, Kent County Council, Maidstone, 1925.
 Sir Patrick Abercrombie, The Preservation of Rural England, Hodder and Stoughton Ltd, London, 1926. The book that lead to the foundation of the CPRE.
 The Earl of Mayo, S. D, Adshead and Patrick Abercrombie, The Thames Valley from Cricklade to Staines: A survey of its existing state and some suggestions for its future preservation, University of London Press, London, 1929
 The Earl of Mayo, S.D. Adshead and Patrick Abercrombie, Regional Planning Report on Oxfordshire, Oxford University Press, 1931
 Patrick Abercrombie and Sydney A. Kelly, East Suffolk Regional Scheme, University of Liverpool, Liverpool and Hodder & Stoughton, London, 1935 (prepared for the East Suffolk Joint Regional Planning Committee).
 Patrick Abercrombie (ed), The Book of the Modern House: A Panoramic Survey of Contemporary Domestic Design, Hodder & Stoughton, London, 1939
 J. H. Forshaw and Patrick Abercrombie, County of London Plan, Macmillan & Co. 1943.
 J. Paton Watson and Patrick Abercrombie, A Plan for Plymouth, Underhill, (Plymouth). Ltd., 1943.
 Edwin Lutyens & Patrick Abercrombie, A Plan for the City & County of Kingston upon Hull, Brown (London & Hull), 1945.
 Sir Patrick Abercrombie, John Owens & H Anthony Mealand, A Plan for Bath, Sir Isaac Pitman (London) 1945
 Sir Patrick Abercrombie & R. H. Matthew, Clyde Valley Regional Plan, His Majesty's Stationery Office, Edinburgh, 1946.
 Patrick Abercrombie, Hong Kong Preliminary Planning Report, Government Printer, Hong Kong, 1948.
 Patrick Abercrombie and Richard Nickson, Warwick: Its preservation and redevelopment, Architectural Press, 1949.
 Sir Patrick Abercrombie, Revised by D. Rigby Childs, Town and Country Planning, Third Edition, Oxford University Press, 1959, Reprinted 1961 and 1967.

References

Sources

External links
 
 RIBA: Royal Inst. of British Architects
 Encyclopædia Britannica, Patrick Abercrombie
 Department of Civic Design, Liverpool
 Warwick Town History, including description of Abercrombie's 1949 redevelopment plan
 GA Presidential Lecture

British urban planners
Academics of University College London
Knights Bachelor
1879 births
1957 deaths
Presidents of the Royal Town Planning Institute
People associated with transport in London
People educated at Uppingham School
Recipients of the Royal Gold Medal
Members of the Royal Academy of Belgium
People from Sale, Greater Manchester
Recipients of the AIA Gold Medal
Presidents of the International Union of Architects